The 2009 NASCAR Camping World East Series was the 23rd season of the Camping World East Series, a touring series sanctioned by NASCAR. Matt Kobyluck entered the season as the defending drivers' champion. Ryan Truex won the championship, 34 points in front of Eddie MacDonald.

This was the last season for the East Series with the Camping World title sponsorship. Because Camping World decided to be the title sponsor for the NASCAR Truck Series starting in 2009, they did not renew their title sponsorship of NASCAR's East and West Series after their contract for that ended at the end of the 2009 season. (So, they sponsored all three series for that year only.) K&N Filters became the new title sponsor for the East and West Series starting in 2010.

Schedule
The schedule was announced on December 24, 2008 with eleven races at ten different tracks. The series lost three tracks from last year's schedule (Stafford Motor Speedway, Music City Motorplex and Mansfield Motorsports Park) but gains one new track for this season (Tri-County Motor Speedway).  The Tennessee State Fairgrounds was initially on the schedule but changes in management of the track (new management decided to eliminate NASCAR sanction) resulted in the loss of the event.

For the fourth year in a row, the regular season began at Greenville-Pickens Speedway on April 11. The series made its first appearance at Tri-County Motor Speedway two weeks later on April 25 before heading to Iowa for the series' third appearance at Iowa Speedway. The Iowa race was a combination East/West race where drivers from both series will compete against each other.  Drivers are awarded points based on their finishing position against drivers in their series. (i.e. Highest finishing driver in the East gets first place points and the highest finishing driver in the West gets first place points)

Traditional stops at New Hampshire Motor Speedway, Thompson International Speedway, Adirondack International Speedway, and Lime Rock Park fill up the bulk of the summer schedule before the regular season finale at Dover International Speedway on September 25.

On March 16, 2009, NASCAR announced that Speed Channel would broadcast each race as part of a one-hour special that would air on Thursdays at 3 p.m. ET.

The 2009 season Toyota All-Star Showdown was held on January 30, 2010, and was televised on Speed Channel. 

1 All races will air tape-delayed on Speed Channel on Thursdays at 3pm ET
2 Non-points event.  This race airs live on Speed Channel.

2009 Series Races

NASCAR Home Tracks 150 presented by Kevin Whitaker Chevrolet 
The NASCAR Home Tracks 150 presented by Kevin Whitaker Chevrolet was held at Greenville-Pickens Speedway on April 11.

Brian Ickler is hoping to use the NASCAR Camping World Series East as a launching pad. Performances like Saturday night at historic Greenville Pickens Speedway certainly don’t hurt his cause, as Ickler led nearly every lap from start to finish in winning the season-opening.

Ickler recorded his fourth career NASCAR Camping World Series East victory and seventh NASCAR Camping World Series victory overall.

Veteran Jody Lavender scored a career-best second-place finish, while Eddie MacDonald finished third. Josh Richards and Brett Moffitt, both making their first career NASCAR starts, rounded out the top five.

Ickler qualified second behind pole position winner Moffitt. A multi-car accident in Turn 1 on the start of the race caused a lengthy red flag before the end of the first lap.  NASCAR decided to reset the lineup of the field with the exception of those cars involved in the accident and do a complete restart of the event.  Several cars came into the pits to repair damage and would have to start at the rear of the field since they were considered to have pitted before the initial green flag. On the second attempt at the start, Ickler got the jump on Moffitt and quickly began to pull away from the field.

MacDonald, restarting on the outside of the front row, briefly took the lead by a nose on two restarts. Each time however, Ickler erased the lead and pulled out to a commanding lead. Ickler led four times for 146 laps. In addition, the victory gave Ickler a secured spot in the postseason NASCAR Toyota All-Star Showdown - a spot reserved for winners of the NASCAR Camping World Series events in 2009.

Fastest Qualifier: Brett Moffitt, Time: 20.691 Seconds, Speed: 

Time of Race: 1 hrs., 22 mins, 9 seconds

Margin of Victory: 0.951 Seconds

Average race speed: 

Cautions: Laps 11-13; 45-48; 99-103; 106-111; 113-118; 129-132; 135-141; 144-146. 8 for 38 laps.

Lead changes: 6 changes involving 2 drivers

Lap Leaders: Ickler 1-48, MacDonald 49, Ickler 50-111, MacDonald 112, Ickler 113-118, MacDonald 119-120, Ickler 121-150.

Total Laps Lead: Brian Ickler 146, Eddie MacDonald 4

Did not Qualify: None

Top 10 Driver Points: Brian Ickler 190, Jody Lavender 170, Eddie MacDonald 170, Josh Richards 160, Brett Moffitt * 155, Patrick Long 150, Steve Park 146, Matt Kobyluck 142, Alan Tardiff 138, Matt DiBenedetto 134

NASCAR Camping World Series East-Tri-County 150
The NASCAR Camping World Series East-Tri-County 150 was held at Tri-County Motor Speedway on April 25.

Matt DiBenedetto took just two starts to find Victory Lane.

The 17-year-old Grass Valley, Calif., driver passed Austin Dillon on a back-and-forth battle following a green-white-checkered finish to Saturday night’s Tri-County 150 to earn his first career NASCAR Camping World Series East victory.

DiBenedetto, a Joe Gibbs Racing development driver, and Dillon, a Richard Childress Racing development driver, swapped the lead six times over the second half of the race. The event was stretched to 165 laps due to a pair of late cautions. DiBenedetto led four times for 75 laps, while Dillon led three times for 15 laps.

On the final restart, Dillon got the jump from the second spot to take the lead. DiBenedetto, however, was able to nose underneath as they came to the white flag and took the lead going into Turn 1 of the final lap.

Rookie Alan Tardiff earned his first Coors Light Pole Award earlier in the day and brought home his best finish with a third-place run. Jody Lavender took over the points lead with a fourth-place finish, while Patrick Long rounded out the top five.

Fastest Qualifier: A.Tardiff *, 16.562 seconds

Time of Race: 1 hour 8 minutes 43 seconds

Margin of Victory: .340 seconds

Average Speed: 

Lead changes: 8 among 4 drivers

Cautions: 8 for 43 laps

Lap Leaders: A. Tardiff 1-16; M. Kobyluck 17-75; M. DiBenedetto 76-101; A. Dillon 102-113; M. DiBenedetto 114-146; A. Dillon 147; M. DiBenedetto 148-162; A. Dillon 163-164; M. DiBenedetto 165

Laps Lead: Matt DiBenedetto 75, Matt Kobyluck 59, Alan Tardiff * 16, Austin Dillon 15

Standings: 1. J. Lavender, 330; 2. M. DiBenedetto, 324; 3. A. Tardiff, 308; 4. P. Long, 305; 5. E. MacDonald, 297; 6. M. Kobyluck, 281; 7. D. Armstrong, 273; 8. S. Park, 264; 9. D. Delaney, 262; 10. R. Duff, 260

Did not Qualify: None

See also
 2009 NASCAR Sprint Cup Series
 2009 NASCAR Nationwide Series
 2009 NASCAR Camping World Truck Series
 2009 ARCA Re/Max Series
 2009 NASCAR Camping World West Series
 2009 NASCAR Canadian Tire Series
 2009 NASCAR Corona Series
 2009 NASCAR Mini Stock Series

References

External links 
Camping World East Series Standings and Statistics for 2009

ARCA Menards Series East